Roger Federer was the defending champion, but was forced to withdraw from the tournament before the semifinals because of a back injury. Following Federer's withdrawal, Stefan Edberg and Jo-Wilfried Tsonga played a one set exhibition match to make up the evening session.

Tsonga won the title beating Gaël Monfils in an all-French final, 7–5, 6–3.

Seeds

Draw

Finals

Top half

Bottom half

Qualifying

Seeds

Qualifiers

Draw

First qualifier

Second qualifier

Third qualifier

Fourth qualifier

References
Main draw
Qualifying draw

Singles